Dianne may refer to:

People
Dianne Brushett
 Dianne Buswell
Dianne Byrum
Dianne Chandler
Dianne Cunningham
Dianne de Leeuw
Dianne Feinstein
Dianne van Giersbergen, Dutch singer
Dianne Haskett
Dianne Heatherington
Dianne Holum
Dianne Jackson
Dianne Kay
Dianne Kirksey
Dianne Morales (born 1967), American non-profit executive and political candidate
Dianne Ruth Pettis
Dianne Poole
Dianne Reeves
Dianne Thompson
Dianne Thorley
Dianne Walker
Dianne Warren, Canadian author
Dianne Wiest
Dianne Yates
Dianne Yerbury
Karen Dianne Baldwin
Sandra Dianne (1994–2020), Malaysian singer-songwriter

Television
Dianne (TV series), a 1971 Canadian television series

See also
 Diane (disambiguation)
 Dian (disambiguation)
 Di (disambiguation)
 Diana (disambiguation)